As of 2020, Bulgaria have qualified for two UEFA European Championships, in 1996 and 2004. However, they did not survive the first round at any occasion. While Bulgaria achieved a win (and a draw) at the 1996 tournament, they lost all their matches in the 2004 edition.

Euro 1996

Group stage

Euro 2004

Group stage

Overall record

Notes

References

 
Countries at the UEFA European Championship